Qingdaobei (Qingdao North) railway station is a railway station in Qingdao, Shandong, China.

Qingdaobei Station is one of the terminal stations of CRH trains (denoted with letter G and D) bound for Qingdao city from major cities in China. Intercity CRH trains running on Qingdao-Rongcheng Intercity Railway (denoted with letter C) and newly scheduled common passenger trains also end their journey here rather than overloaded Qingdao station.

Design

Designed by AREP and MaP3 during a competition in 2007, the station is built on reclaimed land from the sea. The project was inspired by marina's landscape (seagulls, boat masts, cables). The structure shape was obtained by moving and rotating identical frames: "arches" and roof beams, connected together by braced brackets and cables diagonals. Arches and beams are welded on a central beam, with a triangular box section, sheltering technical catwalk. The whole structure is fabricated with folded steel sheets. The roofing is made by aluminium plates interrupted by polycarbonate strips. The ceiling is made of aluminium blades.

Construction
The construction is handled by CSCEC, general contractor. The steel structure was fabricated in Nanjing.

Gallery

Qingdao Metro

Qingdao North Railway Station is a station on Line 1, Line 3 and Line 8 of the Qingdao Metro. It opened on 16 December 2015. It is located in Licang District and it serves Qingdao North (Qingdaobei) railway station.

Gallery

References

External links
 
MaP3 - Photos and details
Publication on Archdaily.com

Railway stations in Shandong
Transport in Qingdao
Stations on the Qingdao–Taiyuan High-Speed Railway
Stations on the Qingdao–Jinan passenger railway
Qingdao Metro stations
Railway stations in China opened in 2014